Middlestone is a village in County Durham, England. It is situated to the south of Spennymoor, near Kirk Merrington. In the 2001 census Middlestone had a population of 67.

References

External links

Villages in County Durham